Acetobacteraceae is a family of Gram-negative bacteria, belonging to the order Rhodospirillales, class Alphaproteobacteria. Two distinct clades are recognized. The acetic acid bacteria and a more heterogeneous group including acidophilic and phototrophic bacteria. The type genus is Acetobacter. Ten genera from Acetobacteraceae make up the acetic acid bacteria.

History
Acetobacteraceae was originally proposed as a family for Acetobacter and Gluconobacter based on rRNA and DNA–DNA hybridization comparisons in 1980.

Genera

Accepted Genera
The following genera have been effectively and validly published:

 Acetobacter Beijerinck 1898 (Approved Lists 1980)
 Acidibrevibacterium Muhadesi et al. 2019
 Acidicaldus Johnson et al. 2006
 Acidiphilium Harrison 1981
 Acidisoma Belova et al. 2009
 Acidisphaera Hiraishi et al. 2000
 Acidocella Kishimoto et al. 1996
 Acidomonas Urakami et al. 1989
 Ameyamaea Yukphan et al. 2010
 Asaia Yamada et al. 2000
 Belnapia Reddy et al. 2006
 Bombella Li et al. 2015
 Caldovatus Habib et al. 2017
 Commensalibacter Roh et al. 2019
 Craurococcus Saitoh et al. 1998
 Crenalkalicoccus Ming et al. 2016
 Dankookia Kim et al. 2016
 Elioraea Albuquerque et al. 2008
 Endobacter Ramírez-Bahena et al. 2013
 Entomobacter Guzman et al. 2021
 Gluconacetobacter corrig. Yamada et al. 1998

 Gluconobacter Asai 1935 (Approved Lists 1980)
 Granulibacter Greenberg et al. 2006
 Humitalea Margesin and Zhang 2013
 Komagataeibacter Yamada et al. 2013
 Kozakia Lisdiyanti et al. 2002
 Lichenicoccus Pankratov et al. 2020
 Lichenicola Noh et al. 2020
 Muricoccus Kämpfer et al. 2003
 Neoasaia Yukphan et al. 2006
 Neokomagataea Yukphan et al. 2011
 Nguyenibacter Vu et al. 2013
 Oecophyllibacter Chua et al. 2021
 Paracraurococcus Saitoh et al. 1998
 Plastoroseomonas Rai et al. 2022
 Rhodopila Imhoff et al. 1984
 Rhodovarius Kämpfer et al. 2004
 Rhodovastum Okamura et al. 2018
 Roseicella Khan et al. 2019
 Roseococcus Yurkov et al. 1994
 Roseomonas Rihs et al. 1998
 Rubritepida Alarico et al. 2002
 Saccharibacter Jojima et al. 2004
 Siccirubricoccus Yang et al. 2017
 Swaminathania Loganathan and Nair 2004
 Swingsia Malimas et al. 2014
 Tanticharoenia Yukphan et al. 2008
 Teichococcus Kämpfer et al. 2003

Provisional Genera
The following genera have been published, but not validated according to the Bacteriological Code:
 "Acetomonas" Leifson 1954
 "Granulobacter" Beijerinck and van Delden 1904
 "Komagatabacter" Yamada et al. 2012
 "Parasaccharibacter" Corby-Harris et al. 2014
 "Sediminicoccus" Qu et al. 2013

References

External links
Acetobacteraceae page on the List of Prokaryotic Names with Standing

Rhodospirillales